Donna Lorraine Matthews (born 2 December 1971) is a Welsh musician who was the lead guitarist of the Britpop band Elastica.

Music career
When she was 20, Matthews answered an advert in Melody Maker for a guitarist with a new band. She became a member of Elastica, subsequently becoming one of their songwriters and credited for many of their tracks. Matthews left Elastica in the spring of 1999 after the band's output had waned and she had developed a heroin habit. In April 2000 she briefly rejoined the band to play one track, "Connection", at the London Kentish Town Forum after being invited out of the audience by Elastica singer Justine Frischmann.

After shaking off her drug addiction she formed an unnamed band with bassist Isabel Waidner and Catrin Jones. In May 2003 they produced and sold 1000 copies of a single, called "L.O.V.E."

In May 2004, Matthews' new band, Klang (with Waidner and drummer Keisuke Hiratsuka) released their debut album, No Sound is Heard. Klang have not produced any output or news since 2005.

On 21 January 2017 three-quarters of the original line-up of Elastica – Matthews, Annie Holland and Justin Welch – worked together on the remastering of Elastica.

As of 2022, Matthews has a YouTube channel where she uploads mostly improvisational music.

Other activities
Matthews subsequently studied music at the Dartington College of Arts in Devon. She was interviewed by Ichthus Christian Fellowship in October 2006.

It was revealed that she had become a Christian. She is working as a missionary with the homeless.

In a 2007 interview Matthews claimed she was still making music but no longer had a desire to be in the public eye. She wanted simply to be "rich in love".

Matthews also played the role of glam rocker Polly Small in the 1998 film Velvet Goldmine.

References

External links

1971 births
Living people
Elastica members
People from Newport, Wales
Welsh Christians
Welsh rock guitarists
Britpop musicians
21st-century British guitarists
21st-century women guitarists